Norberto Galasso (born 28 July 1936 in Buenos Aires) is a historian and essayist from Argentina, who wrote numerous books related about the history of Argentina. His career as historian spans nearly 40 years.

He studied economy in the University of Buenos Aires, graduating in 1961.

In his book Los Malditos (Spanish, "The cursed ones") he analyzed the history of some people usually being relegated to a second plane by other historians, such as Manuel Ugarte, Arturo Jauretche and Raúl Scalabrini Ortiz.

Bibliography

References

1936 births
Writers from Buenos Aires
20th-century Argentine historians
Argentine essayists
Male essayists
Argentine male writers
Argentine socialists
Argentine economists
Living people
University of Buenos Aires alumni
21st-century Argentine historians